Mwalutshe Bwadi (born 5 May 1996) is a DR Congolese footballer who plays as a defender. She has been a member of the DR Congo women's national team.

International career
Bwadi capped for the DR Congo at senior level during the 2012 African Women's Championship.

See also
 List of Democratic Republic of the Congo women's international footballers

References

1996 births
Living people
Women's association football defenders
Democratic Republic of the Congo women's footballers
Democratic Republic of the Congo women's international footballers